The Snake River Valley AVA is an American Viticultural Area that encompasses an area in Southwestern Idaho and two counties in eastern Oregon.  The Idaho Grape Growers and Wine Producers Commission and the Idaho Department of Commerce and Labor filed the petition to recognize the AVA, and it was granted in 2007.  

For wines to bear the Snake River Valley AVA label, at least 85% of the grapes used for production must be grown in the designated area, which includes the Southwestern Idaho counties of Ada, Adams, Boise, Canyon, Elmore, Gem, Gooding, Jerome, Owyhee, Payette, Twin Falls, and Washington, and the Eastern Oregon counties of Malheur and Baker.  

Climate 
Located on the same latitude as Oregon's Umpqua Valley AVA, the Snake River Valley has a more drastic diurnal temperature variation than other appellations in the Pacific Northwest due to the high elevation of most of the region's vineyards.

References

External links
  TTB AVA Map 

 

Geography of Ada County, Idaho
Geography of Adams County, Idaho
Agriculture in Idaho
American Viticultural Areas
Geography of Baker County, Oregon
Geography of Boise County, Idaho
Geography of Canyon County, Idaho
Geography of Elmore County, Idaho
Geography of Gem County, Idaho
Geography of Gooding County, Idaho
Idaho wine
Geography of Jerome County, Idaho
Geography of Malheur County, Oregon
Oregon wine
Geography of Owyhee County, Idaho
Geography of Payette County, Idaho
Snake River
Geography of Twin Falls County, Idaho
Geography of Washington County, Idaho
2007 establishments in Oregon
2007 establishments in Idaho